Mathias Weishaupt (13 May 1899 – 14 February 1975) was a Luxembourgian gymnast. He competed in nine events at the 1924 Summer Olympics.

References

External links
 

1899 births
1975 deaths
Luxembourgian male artistic gymnasts
Olympic gymnasts of Luxembourg
Gymnasts at the 1924 Summer Olympics
Sportspeople from Luxembourg City
20th-century Luxembourgian people